The 2021 season was the San Francisco 49ers' 72nd season in the National Football League, their 76th overall and their fifth under the head coach/general manager tandem of Kyle Shanahan and John Lynch. In honor of the 75th anniversary of the team's founding in 1946, the 49ers introduced a commemorative logo to be used during this season.

They improved from their 6–10 record from the previous year and they returned to the playoffs after a one-year absence. Despite starting 2 - 0, they would lose 4 consecutive games. After an embarrassing Week 9 loss to an injury depleted Arizona Cardinals,  the 49ers had a disappointing 3–5 record. But they would rebound and end the season winning 7 of their last 9 games, including a dramatic Week 18 win over the Los Angeles Rams in which the 49ers fought back from a 17–0 deficit to win 27–24 in overtime, thus allowing them to sneak into the playoffs. During the season, the 49ers showcased a well rounded team, finishing top 10 in both total offense and total defense. The offense averaged 376 yards a game, good for 7th in the league, while averaging 25.1 points a game. The defense was even better, giving up just 310 yards a game, good for 3rd overall. This included the 6th best pass defense and 7th best rush defense. The defense also generated 48 sacks during the season, 5th best in the league.

In the Wild Card Round, the 49ers upset the Dallas Cowboys 23–17. They would then upset the #1 seeded Green Bay Packers 13–10 in the Divisional Round, thus advancing to the NFC Championship for the second time in 3 years. However, they lost to their division rival and eventual Super Bowl champion Los Angeles Rams 17–20.

Offseason

Roster changes

Free agency
The 49ers entered free agency with the following:

Signings

Departures

Draft

Notes

San Francisco traded its first-round selection (12th overall), a 2022 first-round selection, a 2022 third-round selection and a 2023 first-round selection to Miami in exchange for a first-round selection (3rd overall).
San Francisco traded its second-round (43rd overall) and seventh-round (230th overall) selections to Vegas in exchange for a second-round (48th overall) and fourth (121st overall) selections.
San Francisco traded 2 fourth-round selections (117th and 121st overall) to Los Angeles in exchange for a third-round selection (88th overall).
San Francisco traded Kwon Alexander to New Orleans in exchange for a fifth-round conditional pick and LB Kiko Alonso.
San Francisco traded its third-round and 2020 fifth-round selections to Washington in exchange for offensive tackle Trent Williams.
San Francisco received third-round selections in 2021, 2022, and 2023, as compensation when defensive coordinator Robert Saleh was hired by the New York Jets as head coach and vice president of player personnel Martin Mayhew was hired by the Washington Football Team as general manager.
San Francisco lost its 2021 seventh round selection, as Marquise Goodwin reverted from Philadelphia back to San Francisco.
 San Francisco acquired a seventh round selection (No. 230) and defensive end Jordan Willis from the New York Jets in exchange for a 2022 sixth round selection.

Undrafted free agents

Staff

Final roster

<noinclude>

Preseason
The 49ers' preseason schedule was announced on May 12.

Regular season

Schedule
The 49ers' 2021 schedule was announced on May 12.

Game summaries

Week 1: at Detroit Lions

Week 2: at Philadelphia Eagles

Week 3: vs. Green Bay Packers

Week 4: vs. Seattle Seahawks

Week 5: at Arizona Cardinals

Week 7: vs. Indianapolis Colts

Week 8: at Chicago Bears

Week 9: vs. Arizona Cardinals

Week 10: vs. Los Angeles Rams

Week 11: at Jacksonville Jaguars

Week 12: vs. Minnesota Vikings

Week 13: at Seattle Seahawks

Week 14: at Cincinnati Bengals

Week 15: vs. Atlanta Falcons

Week 16: at Tennessee Titans

Week 17: vs. Houston Texans

Week 18: at Los Angeles Rams

Standings

Division

Conference

Postseason

Schedule

Game summaries

NFC Wild Card Playoffs: at (3) Dallas Cowboys

In the first playoff meeting between these two teams since the 1994 NFC Championship, the 49ers upset the Cowboys 23–17. The 49ers' top-five defense shut down the NFL's highest scoring team (the Cowboys were averaging 31.1 points a game during the regular season) to just 17 points, well below the Cowboys' average. This included five sacks, holding the Cowboys to just 77 yards rushing, and one interception, which led to a 49ers touchdown on the next play. The 49ers dominated most of the game, leading 23–7 entering the fourth quarter, and retaining the lead despite a close comeback from the Cowboys. With the win, the 49ers improved their playoff record against the Cowboys to 3–5 all time and defeated the Cowboys for the first time since 2014.

NFC Divisional Playoffs: at (1) Green Bay Packers

The 49ers' Cinderella run continued as they traveled to Lambeau Field and pulled off the upset in a 13–10 win over the heavily favored Green Bay Packers. The game, which was affected by snowfall, was a defensive battle. The Packers started the game with a six-yard touchdown run by AJ Dillion to take a 7–0 lead. For the rest of the game, the 49ers defense only surrendered three more points, aided by five sacks, a fumble recovery, and only giving up 263 total yards of offense to the Packers. The 49ers special teams was pivotal, as they blocked a Packers field goal right before halftime, returned a blocked punt for a game-tying touchdown late in the game, and finally, converted a game-winning field goal by kicker Robbie Gould as time expired, the last of which advanced them to their second NFC Championship in the last three seasons and the 17th NFC Championship overall as a franchise. With the Tennessee Titans' loss earlier in the day to the Cincinnati Bengals, coincidentally also on a field goal as time expired, this was the first time since 2010 that both #1 seeded teams were eliminated in the same weekend. With the win, the 49ers improved  to 4–0 in the playoffs against Packers quarterback Aaron Rodgers. The 49ers recorded five sacks for the second game in a row, which is the first time that has happened in consecutive playoff games since the 1984 season.

NFC Championship: at (4) Los Angeles Rams
The 49ers flew to Los Angeles following their win over the Packers to play their division rival Los Angeles Rams in the NFC Championship Game. During the regular season, the 49ers won both games against the Rams, and were looking to complete the season sweep with a win. 

San Francisco won the coin toss and elected to defer. The two teams traded punts before Rams quarterback Matthew Stafford drove the offense to the 49ers' 3-yard line before throwing a drive-ending interception to Jimmie Ward. However, the 49ers were unable to muster any points off the pick, and were forced to punt. In the second quarter, the Rams struck first with Stafford completing a touchdown pass to wide receiver Cooper Kupp from 16 yards out to give the Rams a 7–0 lead. However, San Francisco struck right back with Jimmy Garoppolo hitting Deebo Samuel for a 44-yard touchdown to tie the game up at 7. On the Rams' next drive, the Rams drove to the 49ers' 38-yard line, but could only pick up 2 yards over the next three downs, and kicker Matt Gay's 54-yard field goal attempt sailed wide of the goalposts. With just under two minutes remaining in the first half, Garoppolo completed four straight passes to set up kicker Robbie Gould's 38-yard field goal at the end of the half to put San Francisco up 10–7.

In the second half, the two teams once again traded punts. On the 49ers' second drive of the half, short runs by Samuel and short passes by Garoppolo drove San Francisco down to the Rams' 16-yard line, where he hooked up with tight end George Kittle for a touchdown to make the score 17–7. On the Rams' ensuing drive, long passes by Stafford led to Kupp's second touchdown of the game from 11 yards out to cut the deficit to 17–14 with thirteen minutes left. On the 49ers' next two drives, they were forced to punt. The Rams capitalized, with Gay scoring two field goals from 40 and 30 yards out respectively to make the score 20–17 in favor of Los Angeles.

With just under two minutes remaining, the 49ers' offense trotted out on the field in an attempt to make a desperate last-minute drive to tie the game. After an incompletion on first down, Garoppolo completed a pass to Jauan Jennings, but was tackled immediately by the Rams' Travin Howard to bring up a 3rd-and-13 on the 49ers' 22-yard line. On the very next play, Garoppolo was washed out of the pocket by the Rams' defensive line. Defensive tackle Aaron Donald got a hand on Garoppolo, and in desperation, Garoppolo lobbed the ball up, where it was tipped by JaMycal Hasty before falling into the hands of Howard for a game and season-ending interception. Three kneeldowns by Stafford ended the game, and sent the Rams to their second Super Bowl in the last 4 years.

Statistics

Team

Individual

Statistics correct as of the end of the 2021 NFL season

References

External links
 
 

San Francisco
San Francisco 49ers seasons
2021 in San Francisco
San Francisco 49ers